Testis specific 10 is a protein that in humans is encoded by the TSGA10 gene.

References

Further reading